Segger is a surname. Notable people with the surname include:

Alexander Segger George (born 1939), Western Australian botanist
Chris Segger, Canadian musician, member or Striker (band)
, American luhe athlete
Marie-Claire Cordonier Segger, American professor, expert in environmental issues, including climate change and biodiversity
 (born 1946) German footballer
 Rolf Segger, founder of Segger Microcontroller Systems

See also
Seeger
 Seger
 Seager